Parachela siamensis is a small species of freshwater ray-finned fish in the carp and minnow family Cyprinidae.

Habitat
Patachela siamensis is found in lowland rivers including streams near peat lands. It is found at the surface in large rivers and lakes. During floods it moves into the flooded forest. It can normally be found alongside Parachela oxygastroides and P. williaminae. Used to make prahok in Cambodia.

Distribution
Patachela siamensis  is widely distributed in  mainland southeast Asia, from the Mae Klong in Thailand to the lower Mekong basin, in Cambodia (including the Tonle Sap), Laos and Vietnam. It has also been recorded from the Tapi River in southern Thailand.

References

External links
http://www.fishbase.org/summary/27043

Cyprinid fish of Asia
Fish of Thailand
Fish described in 1868
Taxa named by Albert Günther